Piotrkower Weker was a Yiddish-language weekly newspaper in interbellum Poland, published from Piotrków Trybunalski. Piotrkower Weker was an organ of the General Jewish Labour Bund in Poland.

References

General Jewish Labour Bund in Poland
Defunct newspapers published in Poland
Publications with year of establishment missing
Publications with year of disestablishment missing
Socialism in Poland
Yiddish-language mass media in Poland
Yiddish socialist newspapers
Weekly newspapers published in Poland